Nelson Bay may refer to:

Nelson Bay, New South Wales
Nelson Bay, Tasmania
Nelson Bay, Alaska
Nelson Bay Cave, South Africa

See also